Several cosmological and mythological systems portray four corners of the world or four quarters of the world corresponding approximately to the four points of the compass (or the two solstices and two equinoxes). At the center may lie a sacred mountain, garden, world tree, or other beginning-point of creation. Often four rivers run to the four corners of the world, and water or irrigate the four quadrants of Earth.

Semitic religions
In Christianity and Judaism, the Old Testament (Book of Genesis) identifies the Garden of Eden, and the four rivers as the Tigris, Euphrates, Pishon, and Gihon. The Tigris runs to Assyria, the Euphrates to Armenia, the Pishon to Havilah or Elam, and the Gihon to Ethiopia.  The four corners of the earth are also spoken of in the book of Revelation 7:1.

Mesopotamian traditions
In Mesopotamian cosmology, four rivers flowing out of the garden of creation, which is the center of the world, define the four corners of the world.

Indian traditions
In Hinduism, the sacred mountain Kailash has four sides, from which four rivers flow to the four quarters of the world (the Ganges, Indus, Oxus (Amu Darya), and Śita (Tarim)), dividing the world into four quadrants. Another account portrays a celestial mountain, Mount Meru, buttressed by four terrestrial mountain ranges which extend in four directions. Between them lie four sacred lakes, through which the celestial river divides into four earthly rivers, which flow to the four corners and irrigate the four quadrants of the Earth. Buddhism and the Bon religion of Tibet have similar accounts.

See also

Four continents
Biblical cosmology
Flat Earth
Time Cube

References

Religious cosmologies
Physical geography
Corners of the world